This list includes actors of Vietnamese descent or nationality that have appeared in a full-length feature film or a television series broadcast on a national network. Although it includes some actors that have performed in films produced in Vietnam, it is not a comprehensive list of all Vietnamese actors who have performed in Vietnamese movies.

Notable actors

References 

Vietnamese
 
Actors